The Gambia College is a Gambian tertiary institution with campuses located in Banjul and Brikama. Its origins lie in the Yundum Teachers Training College, which was founded in 1952 and became the Yundum College in 1955, and the Gambia School of Nursing and Midwifery, the School of Agriculture and the School of Public Health. In 1978, those hitherto separated institutions were merged by an Act of Parliament and The Gambia College was established.
The new college opened in 1980 with two campuses: the School of Nursing and Midwifery is based in Banjul, whereas the Schools of Agriculture, Education, and Public Health are located in Brikama. It closed in March 1981 due to major disturbances by students but reopened in October 1982. After the Gambia College Act was passed in 1989 which required the college to provide further education, it expanded in the 1990s.

References

External links 
 Official website of The Gambia College

Universities and colleges in the Gambia